James Thompson Garrow,  (March 11, 1843 – August 31, 1916) was an Ontario lawyer and political figure. He represented Huron West in the Legislative Assembly of Ontario as a Liberal member from 1890 to 1902.

He was born in Chippawa, Welland County, Canada West in 1843, the son of Edward Garrow, a Scottish immigrant. He studied law, was called to the bar in 1868, entered practice in Goderich with Malcolm Colin Cameron and was named Queen's Counsel in 1885. In 1872, he married Mary Balfour Fletcher. Garrow served as reeve of Goderich from 1874 to 1880 and served one year as warden for Huron County. He died in 1916.

References

External links 
The Canadian parliamentary companion, 1891 JA Gemmill

The Canadian men and women of the time : a handbook of Canadian biography, HJ Morgan (1898)
A Cyclopæedia of Canadian biography : being chiefly men of the time ..., GM Rose (1886)

1843 births
Ontario Liberal Party MPPs
1916 deaths
Canadian King's Counsel